Aroe may refer to:
The Aru Islands Regency, islands in eastern Indonesia
Aroe, an alternative name for Aroi, Patras, in western Greece.